The 1997 UCI Road World Championships took place in San Sebastián, Spain, between October 7 and October 12, 1997. The event consisted of a road race and a time trial for men, women, men under 23, junior men and junior women.

In 2002 UCI sued Festina soigneur Willy Voet for defamation over claims in his book Breaking the Chain that the UCI and Hein Verbruggen had allegedly been involved in some sort of coverup of use of Lidocaine and Laurent Brochard. In 2004 the UCI won the defamation case, and in 2006 won the appeal.

Events summary

References 

 
UCI Road World Championships by year
World Championships
Uci Road World Championships
UCI Road World Championships
Cycling competitions in Spain